Botourmiaviridae is a family of positive-strand RNA viruses which infect plants and fungi. The family includes four genera: Ourmiavirus, Botoulivirus, Magoulivirus and Scleroulivirus. Members of genus Ourmiavirus infect plants and the other genera infect fungi. The member viruses have genomes which range from 2900 to 4800 nucleotides.

Structure 
Ourmiaviruses are the only members of the family that have a viral structure. The other members are naked and have no viral envelope or capsid. Ourmiaviruses are plant viruses that have a bacilliform virion composed of a single capsid protein. The virions have a series of discrete lengths from 30 to 62 nm.

Genome 
Members of the family Botourmiaviridae have positive-sense, single-stranded RNA genomes.  Contrary to the hosts they infect (plants and fungus), their genome is concise and has few redundancies. The genome of the genus Ourmiavirus has three segments that encode the capside protein (CP), movement protein (MP), and RNA-dependent RNA polymerase (RdRp). The length of the genome is around 4800 nucleotides. The genomes of the other three genera of the family are nonsegmented and have lengths which range from 2000 to 3200 nucleotides. The genomes of these fungal viruses only encode an RNA-dependent RNA polymerase and have no structural proteins.

Taxonomy
The family has six genera:
Botoulivirus
Magoulivirus
Ourmiavirus
Penoulivirus
Rhizoulivirus
Scleroulivirus

References 

Viruses
Virus families